Allan Georges Grapard is a French academic, historian and Japanologist.

Early life 
Grapard earned his Ph.D. at the National Institute of Oriental Languages and Civilizations in Paris.

Career 
In 1985, Grapard came to University of California, Santa Barbara as a visiting professor in Japanese religions; and in 1986, he was invited to join the faculty of the Religious Studies Department.

Today Grapard is Professor Emeritus of East Asian Languages and Cultural Studies (EALCS) at the same institute.

In the historiography of Japanese religions, he is known for developing innovative theoretical propositions:
 "Japanese religiosity is grounded in specific sites at which beliefs and practices were combined."
 "Japanese religiosity is neither Shinto nor Buddhist nor sectarian but is essentially combinative."
 "Those combinative systems which evolved in specific sites are related to institutions of power and, therefore, to political, social, and economic order, all of which are interrelated and embodied in rituals and institutions marking those sites."

Selected works 
In a statistical overview derived from writings by and about Allan Grapard, OCLC/WorldCat encompasses roughly 10 works in 10+ publications in 4 languages and 500+ library holdings.

 Japan's Ignored Cultural Revolution: the Separation of Shinto and Buddhist Divinities in Meiji (shimbutsu bunri) and a Case Study: Tonomine (1984)
 Kukai: la vérité finale des trois enseignements (1985)
 Voltaire and East Asia: a Few Reflections on the Nature of Humanism (1985)
 Lotus in the Mountain, Mountain in the Lotus: Rokugō kaizan Nimmon daibosatsu hongi (1986)
 The Protocol of the Gods: a Study of the Kasuga Cult in Japanese History (1992)
 The Shinto of Yoshida Kanetomo (1992)

 Articles
 "Institution, Ritual, and Ideology: The Twenty-Two Shrine-Temple Multiplexes of Heian Japan." History of Religions, 27 (1988): 246-269

References 

French Japanologists
Historians of Japan
Living people
Year of birth missing (living people)